Mário Brasini (January 31, 1921 – October 9, 1997) was a Brazilian actor, screenwriter and film director.

Selected filmography

Actor
 Iracema (1949)

References

Bibliography 
 Hammer, Tad Bentley. International film prizes: an encyclopedia. Garland, 1991.

External links 
 

1921 births
1997 deaths
Brazilian male film actors
Brazilian film directors
Brazilian screenwriters
Male actors from Rio de Janeiro (city)
20th-century Brazilian male actors
20th-century screenwriters

Brazilian people of Italian descent